Trinity Episcopal Church, now known as the Faith by Love Church, is a historic Episcopal church located in the Southwest / Near Westside neighborhood of Syracuse, Onondaga County, New York.  The church was built in 1914–1915, and is a one-story, Collegiate Gothic style stone building.  It has a steeply pitched front gable slate roof and a massive square tower with corner buttresses.  Also on the property is the contributing Parish House.  It is a two-story, Second Empire style frame dwelling with a mansard roof.  The Jaynes Memorial Hall was added to the rear of the Parish House in 1926. The congregation was established in 1855, and remained at the location until 1994.

It was listed on the National Register of Historic Places in 2013.

The Trinity Church, Leyfield Parish House and William J. Gillett House were listed as sold in December 2017, for $185,000.

References 

Episcopal church buildings in New York (state)
1855 establishments in New York (state)
Churches on the National Register of Historic Places in New York (state)
Gothic Revival church buildings in New York (state)
Churches completed in 1915
Churches in Syracuse, New York
National Register of Historic Places in Syracuse, New York